Reeses Mill is an unincorporated community on Patterson Creek in Mineral County, West Virginia, United States. Reeses Mill is home to Camp Minco.

Unincorporated communities in Mineral County, West Virginia
Unincorporated communities in West Virginia